Laura Drummond is a Canadian actress. She is the wife of Brian Drummond and is a co-founder of the Urban Academy school based in New Westminster.

Personal life
She has been married to voice actor Brian Drummond since 1992, together they have a son and two daughters, Aidan (born 1995), Brynna (born 1997, pronounced BRIN-ah) and Ashlyn.

Filmography

Animation
Fantastic Four: World's Greatest Heroes — Courtney Bonner-Davis

Live action
Stargate: SG-1 — Security Guard
Love Under the Olive Tree — Gloria Cabella
Riverdale — Mrs. Button (Episode: "Chapter Thirty-Seven: Fortune and Men's Eyes")
Superman & Lois — Sandra Vance (Episode "Tried and True")

Dubbing roles

Animation
Mobile Suit Gundam Seed Destiny — Shinn's Mother
Starship Operators — Imari Kamiya
The Little Prince — Turquoise in "The Planet of Ludokaa" arc

References

External links
 
 
 

Canadian film actresses
Canadian television actresses
Canadian voice actresses
Living people
Year of birth missing (living people)